Nur Muhammad Shah bin Shahiran (born 14 November 1999) is a Singaporean professional footballer who plays as a midfielder for Singapore Premier League club Tampines Rovers, and the Singapore national team. He is widely regarded as one of Singapore’s top talented young players due too his long-shots and aggressive style of play.

Club career

Tampines Rovers 
In 2022, Shah signed a five year contract with Tampines Rovers.

International career
Shah was first called up to the national team in 2022, for the FAS Tri-Nations Series 2022 against Malaysia and Philippines on 26 and 29 March 2022 respectively. Shah made his international debut on 29 March 2022, coming on as a late substitute for Song Ui-young, in a 2-0 win against Philippines. 

Shah scored his first goal for the Lions in the opening match against Myanmar in the 2022 AFF Championship, helping his team to a 3-2 win.

Career statistics

Club

Notes

International

International caps

International goals
Scores and results list Singapore's goal tally first.

U23 International caps

U23 International goals

U19 International caps

References 

Living people
1999 births
Malaysian footballers
Singapore Premier League players
Geylang International FC players
Balestier Khalsa FC players
Association football midfielders
Competitors at the 2019 Southeast Asian Games
Competitors at the 2021 Southeast Asian Games
Southeast Asian Games competitors for Singapore